Ahmad Khan Barha was a powerful general in Mughal Emperor Akbar's army during the 16th century.

Sayyed Ahmad was the brother of Sayyed Mahmud Khan Barha Kundliwal. He gained the emperor's respect due to his bravery and valour. He joined the king's service along with his brother as part of the advance force sent to Gujarat. After the Ahmadabad victory, the king sent him in pursuit of the sons of Sher K. Fuladi who had gone to Idar. Though they moved swiftly, and entered the mountain defiles, many of their goods fell into the hands of the king's soldiers. Sayyed Ahmad returned to the king and did homage.

Afterwards when Patan became the royal camp it was made over to Mirza Khan (Abdu-r-Rahim S. Bairam) and Sayyed Ahmad became governor (on account of Mirza's youth). In the same year Muhammad Hussain Mirza and Shah Mirza besieged Patan along with Sher Khan. Sayyed Ahmad Khan looked after the fortifications and defended the place. Later Khan Azim Koka approached with a large force and the Mirza's withdrew from the siege.

During the Battle of Haldighati Sayyed Ahmad accompanied Raja Man Singh, Sayyed Hashim Barha, Raja Jaimal, Ghazi Khan and other well known warriors. Sayyed Ahmad commanded the army's right wing. In the 20th year of his reign he was sent with his nephews Sayyed Hashim Barha and Sayyed Qasim Barha to defeat the rebels connected with the Rana-who after the killing of Jalal K. Qurci had created strife. Because of his success, Sayyed Ahmad was granted a standard and Drums, a great honor.

He died in the 1570s and is buried at his ancestral place Mujhera in Muzaffarnagar district. His rank was three thousand persons (Zat) and two thousand horses (sawar).

References 
Samsamuddaula Shahnawaz Khan. Mathirul Umara. trans. Henry Beverage.
Ain-e-Akbari By Abul Fazal
Akbarnama by Abul Fazal

Mughal generals